Donald Phillip McFadyen (March 24, 1907 – May 26, 1990) was a professional ice hockey player who played 164 games in the National Hockey League.  Born in Crossfield, Alberta, he played for the Chicago Black Hawks and won the Stanley Cup in 1934.

External links 

1907 births
1990 deaths
Canadian ice hockey centres
Canadian people of Scottish descent
Chicago Blackhawks players
Ice hockey people from Alberta
Marquette Golden Eagles men's ice hockey players
People from Rocky View County
Stanley Cup champions